Dick van Eijmeren (born April 2, 1990) is a Dutch retired footballer.

Club career

Netherlands
Van Eijmeren played for Dutch senior youth side MVV '27, and was part of the youth system of senior amateur team Excelsior Maassluis, before turning professional with Eredivisie side NAC Breda in 2008. Van Eijmeren played extensively with Breda's reserves, but never made a first team appearance, and moved to vv Capelle in the Topklasse in 2010-11.

United States
Van Eijmeren moved to the United States in 2011 to play for the Dayton Dutch Lions in the USL Professional Division in 2011. He made his debut for the Lions on April 23, 2011 in a 3-2 loss to the Rochester Rhinos.

Van Eijmeren retired in 2014 due to injury, while playing for Excelsior Maassluis again.

References

External links
 Dayton Dutch Lions profile

1990 births
Living people
Association football defenders
Dutch footballers
NAC Breda players
Van Eijmeren, Dick
Excelsior Maassluis players
VV Capelle players
Dutch expatriate footballers
Expatriate soccer players in the United States
Dutch expatriate sportspeople in the United States